Awning is an outdoor 1976 painted aluminum sculpture by Canadian artist Douglas Senft, located near Southwest 3rd Avenue and Southwest Market Street in downtown Portland, Oregon. The  sculpture was selected and funded by the Portland Development Commission from more than 200 proposals in a request for art intended to "humanize the modern architecture" of the Portland Center. Senft was 26 years old when Awning was installed. It is part of the collection of the Regional Arts & Culture Council. The yellow-colored work is mounted to the side of 200 Market along a pedestrian trail that serves as an extension of Third Avenue.

Reception
In 2011, Ben Waterhouse of Willamette Week called Awning an "eyesore" after realizing the sculpture was "not a garish and whimsical air vent, but a work of art". He wrote, "It doesn't help that there is no plaque to be found anywhere in the vicinity to indicate that the sculpture was designed by anyone but an anonymous metalworker. If the Portland Development Commission is going to buy art that looks like ductwork, it should at least be labeled as such. Or is the piece's anonymity intentional, and the indifference of unaware passers-by its real achievement? Oh, my head!"

See also

 1976 in art

References

External links
 Portland Cultural Tours: Public Art Walking Tour (PDF), Regional Arts & Culture Council
 Awning; 1976; Senft, Douglas, Art, Architecture and Engineering Library, University of Michigan Library

1976 establishments in Oregon
1976 sculptures
Aluminum sculptures in Oregon
Outdoor sculptures in Portland, Oregon
Southwest Portland, Oregon
Works by Canadian people